Ateleia salicifolia is a species of flowering plant in the family Fabaceae. It is found only in Cuba. It is threatened by habitat loss.

References

Swartzieae
Flora of Cuba
Vulnerable plants
Taxonomy articles created by Polbot